Darlington Building Society is a UK building society, which has its head office in Darlington, County Durham, England. It is a member of the Building Societies Association. It currently has branches in Barnard Castle, Bishop Auckland, Darlington (Tubwell Row), Guisborough, Middlesbrough, Northallerton, Redcar, Stockton and Yarm.

The Society offers a range of products including: Savings accounts and mortgage.

In 2021 it was named building society of the year  after investing heavily in digital banking, working with UK based IT company IeDigital.

Every year it donates 5% of its profits to local good causes, supporting mental health, climate, poverty, loneliness and developing skills for the unemployed.

References

External links
Darlington Building Society
Building Societies Association
KPMG Building Societies Database 2008

Building societies of England
Banks established in 1856
Organizations established in 1856
Organisations based in County Durham
1856 establishments in England